Naceur Bedoui (born 15 November 1964) is a Tunisian footballer. He played in three matches for the Tunisia national football team from 1992 to 1999. He was also named in Tunisia's squad for the 2000 African Cup of Nations tournament.

References

External links
 

1964 births
Living people
Tunisian footballers
Tunisia international footballers
2000 African Cup of Nations players
People from Sfax
Association football goalkeepers
Espérance Sportive de Tunis players
CS Sfaxien players